Linn is the surname of:

 Amnon Linn (1924–2016), Israeli politician
 Bettina Linn (1905–1962), American novelist and college professor
 George Ward Linn (1884-1966), American philatelist and journal publisher
 James Weber Linn (1876–1939), American politician and educator
 Karl Linn (1923–2005), landscape architect, psychologist, educator, and community activist
 Lewis F. Linn (1796-1843), U.S. Senator of Missouri
 Richard Linn, Senior Judge U.S. Court of Appeals for the Federal Circuit
 Robert Linn (1908–2004), American politician
 Robert Linn (composer) (1925–1999), American composer
 Robert L. Linn (1938–2015), American educational psychologist
 Roger Linn, inventor of the Linn LM-1, the first programmable digital drum machine
 William Linn (clergyman) (1752–1808), President of Queen's College (now Rutgers University) and Chaplain of the United States House of Representatives
 William Linn (soldier) (died 1836?), believed to have fought and died in the Battle of the Alamo
 William Alexander Linn (1846–1917), American journalist and historian

See also
Lin (surname)
Lynn (surname)